Caprella tuberculata is a species of skeleton shrimp in the genus Caprella. It is native to the North Sea.

References

Corophiidea
Crustaceans described in 1836